Edington is a rural village, situated on the north side of the Polden Hills in the Sedgemoor district of Somerset, England.

Either side of it lie the villages of Chilton Polden and Catcott, and north of it is the small village of Burtle. There is a 12th-century church, but the nearest primary school is in the village of Catcott.

Edington has a surgery and an active village hall where the annual pantomime is held. At the north end of the village is a Holy Well which, since recent drainage work was carried out for Wessex Water, no longer functions.

History
Edington was once linked to the towns of Glastonbury and Burnham-on-Sea by the Somerset and Dorset Joint Railway and was later a junction for the short branch to Bridgwater, which opened in 1890. Edington railway station was known as Edington Junction between 1890 and 1953, changing to Edington Burtle on the closure of the Bridgwater line and closing on 7 March 1966.

Governance
The parish council has responsibility for local issues, including setting an annual precept (local rate) to cover the council’s operating costs and producing annual accounts for public scrutiny. The parish council evaluates local planning applications and works with the local police, district council officers, and neighbourhood watch groups on matters of crime, security, and traffic. The parish council's role also includes initiating projects for the maintenance and repair of parish facilities, as well as consulting with the district council on the maintenance, repair, and improvement of highways, drainage, footpaths, public transport, and street cleaning. Conservation matters (including trees and listed buildings) and environmental issues are also the responsibility of the council.

The village falls within the Non-metropolitan district of Sedgemoor, which was formed on 1 April 1974 under the Local Government Act 1972, having previously been part of Bridgwater Rural District, which is responsible for local planning and building control, local roads, council housing, environmental health, markets and fairs, refuse collection and recycling, cemeteries and crematoria, leisure services, parks, and tourism.

Somerset County Council is responsible for running the largest and most expensive local services such as education, social services, libraries, main roads, public transport, policing and  fire services, trading standards, waste disposal and strategic planning.

The village falls within the 'West Polden' electoral ward. The ward stretches from Burtle in the north to Stawell in the south. The total ward population as at the 2011 census was 2,375.

It is also part of the Bridgwater and West Somerset county constituency represented in the House of Commons of the Parliament of the United Kingdom. It elects one Member of Parliament (MP) by the first past the post system of election, and was part of the South West England constituency of the European Parliament prior to Britain leaving the European Union in January 2020, which elected seven MEPs using the d'Hondt method of party-list proportional representation.

Geography
Catcott, Edington and Chilton Moors SSSI is a 1083 hectare biological Site of Special Scientific Interest consisting of land south of the River Brue managed by Somerset Wildlife Trust and is known for the variety of the bird life. The site consists of low-lying land south of the River Brue, which floods on a regular basis; land north is included in the Tealham and Tadham Moors SSSI. The site is managed by Somerset Wildlife Trust and includes the Catcott Lows National Nature Reserve, of grassland in the summer, but flood during the winter, creating a perfect habitat for wintering waterfowl and Bewick's swans,  Roe deer and several invertebrate species of scientific interest also inhabit the area, Catcott Heath and Catcott North.

References

Sources
Railway information

External links

VCH entry
GENUKI(tm) page

Villages in Sedgemoor
Somerset Levels
Civil parishes in Somerset
Holy wells in England